The women's distance medley relay at the 2015 IAAF World Relays was held at the Thomas Robinson Stadium on 2 May.

With the pre-meet world record being set by an American University (Villanova University), the first running of this event at the international level made this a ripe candidate for a new record.

The race was competitive through the first leg, with Renelle Lamote of France have a marginal lead over Treniere Moser from the USA, with Kenyan Selah Jepleting Busienei just a step behind.  Then Olympic champion Sanya Richards-Ross blew the race open, passing before the backstretch and opening up almost 20 metres on the French and Kenyan teams.  Young star Ajee' Wilson doubled the lead before handing off to Shannon Rowbury while Kenya pulled into second with the field tightening behind them.  Rowbury, a world championship bronze medalist more than held her own, crossing the line in 10:36.50, the American team taking almost 12 seconds out of the old record.  In their wake, Kenya, Poland, and Australia also finished under the old record.

Records
Prior to the competition, the records were as follows:

Schedule

Results

Final
The final was started at 21:08.

References

Distance medley relay
2015 in women's athletics